Sport Club Municipal Craiova, commonly referred to as simply SCM Craiova, is a professional women's handball club in Craiova, Oltenia, Romania, that competes in the Liga Naţională.

Kits

Honours

Domestic

Leagues 
 Liga Națională 
 Runners-up: 2017–18

Cups 
 Cupa României
 Runners-up: 2016-2017
 Third place: 2014-2015
 Supercupa României
 Runners-up: 2016-2017

European 
 EHF Cup
 Winners (1): 2017–18

Players
Squad for the 2022–23 season

Goalkeepers

 1  Anastasija Babović 
 12  Bianca Curmenț
 24  Helena Sousa
 33  Diana Adriana Susnea
Wingers

LW
 4  Samira Rocha
 5  Alina Grigorie
 13  Dijana Mugoša 
RW
 10  Patricia Ghețu
 33  Katarina Krpež Šlezak 

Line players
 6  Carmen Ilie Șelaru
 7  Ruth João
 35  Ștefania Jipa
 37  Hristina Rešetar

Back players
LB
 17  Alexandra Andrei-Gogoriță
 26  Nicoleta Tudorică
 89  [[Florina-Cristina Burcea-Zamfir 

CB
 8  Valentina Ion 
 11  Ana Maria Țicu
 19  Denisa Vâlcan
 39  Melanie Bak
RB
 3  Adina Cace
 9  Ana-Paula Rodrigues-Belo

Transfers
Transfers for the 2023-24 season 

 Joining
  Đurđina Malović (RB) (from  Toulon Métropole Var Handball)
  Katarina Bojicic (Line Player) (from  ŽORK Jagodina

 Leaving

Staff members
  Head Coach: Bogdan Burcea

Notable former players
  Valentina Ardean-Elisei
  Iulia Dumanska 
  Andreea Pricopi 
  Ana Maria Tănasie 
  Aneta Udriștioiu
  Mădălina Zamfirescu
  Cristina Florica 
  Nicoleta Dincă
  Mihaela Tivadar
  Ionica Munteanu
  Mirela Pașca
  Carmen Amariei
  Patricia Vizitiu
  Timea Tătar
  Roxana Han
  Daniela Băbeanu
  Bianca Tiron 
 
  Deonise Fachinello
  Mariana Costa 
  Andrea Šerić 
  Laurisa Landre
  Florentina Stanciu 
  Ane Eidem
  Elena Gjeorgjievska
  Bobana Klikovac
  Jelena Trifunović
  Željka Nikolić
  Jelena Živković-Lavko 
  Yuliya Snopova
  Iaroslava Burlachenko
  Yulia Khavronina
  Ekaterina Dzhukeva 
  Hege Løken

Notable former coaches
  Gheorghe Sbora 
  Victorina Bora
  Aurelian Roșca 
  Carmen Amariei
  Simona Gogîrlă
  Grigore Albici

External links
  
 

Liga Națională (women's handball) clubs
Handball clubs established in 2006
2006 establishments in Romania